Bridgeton Central railway station was located in Glasgow, Scotland and served the Bridgeton area of that city. On the Glasgow City and District Railway it was located on the modern North Clyde line on a branch from High Street and acted as a terminus for services from the north west of the city.

Though electrified in 1960 as part of the Glasgow North Bank suburban electrification scheme, it was closed to passenger in November 1979 when the Argyle Line reopened (the recommissioned station on this route at  effectively replaced it).  It was then used as a maintenance depot for the Class 303 and Class 311 fleet until final closure in June 1987. The tracks were subsequently lifted and platforms demolished.  The station building, now in commercial and residential use, is protected as a category B listed building.

References

Notes

Sources

External links
Railscot - Photos of Bridgeton Central

Disused railway stations in Glasgow
Railway stations in Great Britain opened in 1892
Railway stations in Great Britain closed in 1979
Listed railway stations in Scotland
Category B listed buildings in Glasgow
Former North British Railway stations
Bridgeton–Calton–Dalmarnock